The Taringamotu River is a river of the Manawatū-Whanganui region of New Zealand's North Island. It rises at the southern end of the Hauhungaroa Range, flowing generally west to meet the Ongarue River, part of the Whanganui River system, close to the town of Taumarunui.

See also
List of rivers of New Zealand

References

Rivers of Manawatū-Whanganui
Rivers of New Zealand